Jorge Luis Maysonet (born 13 February 1964) is a Puerto Rican former professional boxer who challenged for the IBF welterweight title in 1989. As an amateur, he competed in the men's light welterweight event at the 1984 Summer Olympics.

References

External links
 

1964 births
Living people
Puerto Rican male boxers
Olympic boxers of Puerto Rico
Boxers at the 1984 Summer Olympics
People from Cataño, Puerto Rico
Welterweight boxers
Light-welterweight boxers